Margaret "Peggy" Michel (born February 2, 1949) is a former professional tennis player from the U.S. She was a doubles specialist who won three Grand Slam titles, all with Evonne Goolagong.

She was born in Santa Monica, California.

Grand Slam finals

Doubles 4 (3–1)

Other WTA titles

 1973 Canadian Open (with Evonne Goolagong) defeating Helga Masthoff/Martina Navratilova 6–3, 6–2
 1974 Queensland State Championships (with Evonne Goolagong) defeating Vicki Lancaster/Ceci Martinez 6–1, 6–2
 1974 New South Wales Championships (with Evonne Goolagong) defeating Olga Morozova/Martina Navratilova 6–7, 6–4, 6–1

External links

 
 

Living people
1949 births
American female tennis players
Tennis players from Santa Monica, California
Grand Slam (tennis) champions in women's doubles
Australian Open (tennis) champions
Wimbledon champions
21st-century American women